The Bursa Subregion (Turkish: Bursa Alt Bölgesi) (TR41) is a statistical subregion in Turkey.

Provinces 
 Bursa Province (TR411)
 Eskişehir Province (TR412)
 Bilecik Province (TR413)

See also 
 NUTS of Turkey

Sources 
 ESPON Database

External links 
 TURKSTAT 

Statistical subregions of Turkey